Anania ochrofascialis is a species of moth in the family Crambidae. It is found in Ukraine, the southern part of European Russia (south of the Dead Sea), Azerbaijan, Egypt, Tunisia and Kazakhstan.

The length of the forewings is 7–9 mm. The forewing ground colour is whitish with beige to pale brown pattern elements. The hindwings are white, with white spots between veins.

References

Moths described in 1882
Pyraustinae
Moths of Europe
Moths of Asia
Moths of Africa